is a former Japanese football player.

Club statistics

References

External links
j-league

1986 births
Living people
Osaka University of Health and Sport Sciences alumni
Association football people from Shiga Prefecture
Japanese footballers
J1 League players
J2 League players
Nagoya Grampus players
Kyoto Sanga FC players

Association football defenders